Ayah Faisal Ayed Al-Majali (born 9 March 1992), known as Ayah Al-Majali, is a Jordanian footballer, who plays as a defender for the Turkish Women's Super League club Konak Belediyespor in İzmir and the Jordan women's national team.

Club career
Al-Majali played for the Women's League club Shabab Al-Ordon in her country, before she moved to Turkey to join the İzmir-based club Konak Belediyespor in the Turkcell Women's Super League.

References 

1992 births
Living people
Sportspeople from Amman
Jordanian women's footballers
Jordan Women's Football League players
Women's association football defenders
Jordan women's international footballers
FIFA Century Club
Footballers at the 2006 Asian Games
Footballers at the 2010 Asian Games
Footballers at the 2014 Asian Games
Asian Games competitors for Jordan
Jordanian expatriate footballers
Jordanian expatriate sportspeople in Turkey
Expatriate women's footballers in Turkey
Konak Belediyespor players
Turkish Women's Football Super League players
Saudi Women's Premier League players